Peter Karageorgevitch (born 5 February 1980), also known as Prince Peter of Serbia and Yugoslavia, is a Spanish-Serbian graphic designer and a member of the House of Karađorđević. He is the oldest grandchild and the first grandson of the last Yugoslav king, Peter II. Between his birth and his renunciation in 2022, he was known as the Hereditary Prince.

Early life and education
Peter is the first son and the oldest child of the last Crown Prince of the former Kingdom of Yugoslavia, Alexander, and Princess Maria da Gloria of Orléans-Braganza. He was born at Prentice Women's Hospital in Chicago and lived there until the end of 1981, when he moved with his parents to Virginia. In 1983, he first attended morning pre-school in Tysons Corner, Virginia, and in 1984, he went to day school. His godfather was Prince Alexander of Yugoslavia, a son of Prince Paul of Yugoslavia. His godmother is Anne, Princess Royal. Peter has two younger brothers, twins Philip and Alexander (born 1982).

Peter's parents divorced in 1985. After the divorce, his father married Katherine Clairy Batis later that year, while his mother married Ignacio, Duke of Segorbe later that year also. Through his mother, Peter has two younger half-sisters, Sol María de la Blanca Medina y Orléans-Braganza, Countess of Ampurias (b. 1986) and Ana Luna Medina y Orléans-Braganza, Countess of Ricla (b. 1988).

In 1991, Peter with his father and brothers briefly visited Belgrade, Yugoslavia. In February 2001, the Parliament of FR Yugoslavia passed legislation conferring citizenship on members of the Karađorđević family, making Peter eligible for a Yugoslav citizenship. In July 2001, his father and step-mother moved to Belgrade, Serbia, FR Yugoslavia.

In June 1998, Peter graduated from The King's School, Canterbury, in England, having obtained three A-levels in Art, Spanish, and French, and ten GCSEs. In 1999, he completed in London an art foundation course at Camberwell College of Arts (London Institute). He spent the 1999–2000 year at the Rhode Island School of Design (RISD). In May 2000, he concluded a series of art programs on the European continent mainly in Barcelona and Seville, Spain.

Public life 
Prince Peter attended the reburial of his grandparents King Peter II and Queen Alexandra, great-grandmother Queen Maria, and great-uncle Prince Andrew in the Royal Family Mausoleum at Oplenac on 26 May 2013. The Serbian Royal Regalia were placed over King Peter's coffin, having Peter placing the Karađorđević Crown.

On 17 July 2015, Prince Peter and his brothers were present at their father's 70th birthday celebration in Belgrade. The event gathered 400 guests, including Carl XVI Gustaf of Sweden and Albert II of Monaco among others.

On 27 April 2022, Prince Peter renounced his title of Hereditary Prince – for himself and his descendants – in favor of his younger brother Philip. The ceremony took place in Seville at Casa de Pilatos in the presence of his mother Princess Maria da Gloria, his stepfather Duke Ignacio, his brother Philip, his sister-in-law Princess Danica, his half sister Countess Sol, Ljubodrag Grujić, member of the Crown Council, Chancellor of the Orders and the Herald of the House of Karađorđević, and Nikola Stanković, Chief of Staff of the Crown Prince. His father, Crown Prince Alexander, did not attend the event. The Crown Prince was dissatisfied with Peter's renunciation.

Personal life 
Prince Peter used to work in a field of graphic design and art direction in London and New York City. In 2009, he moved to New York and later moved to Seville. He is currently based in London.

Peter has a daughter born in 2017 by Lauren Estelle Jones.

Titles, styles, honours and arms

Titles
1980–2003: His Royal Highness Prince Peter, Hereditary Prince of Yugoslavia
2003–2022: His Royal Highness Prince Peter, Hereditary Prince of Serbia and Yugoslavia
2022–present: His Royal Highness Prince Peter of Serbia and Yugoslavia

Honours
  House of Karađorđević: Knight Grand Collar of the Royal Order of Saint Prince Lazarus
  House of Karađorđević: Knight Grand Cross of the Royal Order of the Star of Karađorđe.
  House of Karađorđević: Knight Grand Cross of the Royal Order of the White Eagle
  House of Karađorđević: Knight Grand Cross of the Royal Order of the Crown
  House of Karađorđević: Knight Grand Cross of the Royal Order of St. Sava

Ancestors
Peter is a member of the House of Karađorđević. Through his father, Peter descends from kings Nicholas I of Montenegro, Ferdinand I of Romania, Christian IX of Denmark and Alexander of Greece, and furthermore from emperors Nicholas I of Russia and Frederick III of the Germans and Queen Victoria of the United Kingdom of Great Britain and Ireland. In 2010, he was among top 100 in the line of succession to the British throne.

Through his mother, Peter descends from the Emperor Pedro II of Brazil, and kings Louis Philippe I of France and Francis I of the Two Sicilies, and furthermore from Francis I, Holy Roman Emperor and king Charles III of Spain.

References

External links 
  at the Royal Family of Serbia Official Website

1980 births
Living people
Alumni of Camberwell College of Arts
Karađorđević dynasty
People from Chicago
People educated at The King's School, Canterbury
Rhode Island School of Design alumni
Peter
Serbian expatriates in Spain
Serbian expatriates in the United Kingdom
Serbian graphic designers
Serbian people of Danish descent
Serbian people of English descent
Serbian people of German descent
Serbian people of French descent
Serbian people of Portuguese descent
Serbian people of Brazilian descent